Sida is a genus of flowering plants in the mallow family, Malvaceae. They are distributed in tropical and subtropical regions worldwide, especially in the Americas. Plants of the genus may be known generally as fanpetals or sidas.

Description
These are annual or perennial herbs or shrubs growing up to 2m tall (6 feet). Most species have hairy herbage. The leaf blades are usually unlobed with serrated edges, but may be divided into lobes. They are borne on petioles and have stipules. Flowers are solitary or arranged in inflorescences of various forms. Each has five hairy sepals and five petals in shades of yellow, orange, or white. There are many stamens and a style divided into several branches. The fruit is a disc-shaped schizocarp up to 2 cm (3/4 inch) wide which is divided into five to 12 sections, each containing one seed. The pollens are spherical in shape.

Ecology
Many Sida are attractive to butterflies and moths. Arrowleaf sida (Sida rhombifolia), for example, is a larval host for the tropical checkered skipper (Pyrgus oileus).

The Sida golden mosaic virus and Sida golden yellow vein virus have been first isolated from Sida species; the former specifically from Sida santaremensis.

Etymology
The genus name Sida is from the Greek for "pomegranate or water lily". Carl Linnaeus adopted the name from the writings of Theophrastus.

Diversity

Sida has historically been a wastebasket taxon, including many plants that simply did not fit into other genera of the Malvaceae. Species have been continually reclassified. The circumscription of Sida is still unclear, with no real agreement regarding how many species belong there. Over 1000 names have been placed in the genus, and many authorities accept about 150 to 250 valid names today. Some sources accept as few as 98 species. There are many plants recognized as Sida that have not yet been described to science.

Species include:
Sida abutifolia Mill. – prostrate sida, spreading fanpetals
Sida acuta Burm.f. (syn. S. carpinifolia) – common wireweed, broomweed
Sida aggregata C.Presl – savannah fanpetals
Sida antillensis – Antilles fanpetals
Sida calyxhymenia – rock sida, tall sida
Sida cardiophylla (Benth.) F.Muell.
Sida ciliaris – bracted fanpetals, fringed fanpetals
Sida clementii Domin
Sida cordata – long-stalk sida, heartleaf fanpetals
Sida cordifolia L. – country-mallow, flannel sida
Sida echinocarpa F.Muell.
Sida elliottii – Elliott's fanpetals
Sida fallax Walp. – ilima, yellow ilima 
Sida glabra – smooth fanpetals
Sida glomerata – clustered fanpetals 
Sida hermaphrodita – Virginia fanpetals, river-mallow
Sida intricata F.Muell. – twiggy sida
Sida jamaicensis – Jamaican fanpetals 
Sida javensis
Sida lindheimeri – showy fanpetals 
Sida linifolia – flaxleaf fanpetals, balai grand 
Sida longipes – stockflower fanpetals
Sida mysorensis Wight & Arnott
Sida neomexicana – New Mexico fanpetals
Sida nesogena
Sida phaeotricha F.Muell. – hill sida
Sida picklesiana
Sida pusilla
Sida repens – Javanese fanpetals
Sida rhombifolia L. – arrowleaf sida, Cuban jute
Sida rubromarginata – red-margin fanpetals 
Sida salviifolia – escoba parada
Sida santaremensis – moth fanpetals
Sida spenceriana F.Muell.
Sida spinosa – prickly sida, prickly fanpetals 
Sida tragiifolia – catnip noseburn, earleaf fanpetals 
Sida trichopoda F.Muell. – hairy sida
Sida troyana
Sida ulmifolia Mill. – common wireweed, common fanpetals
Sida urens – tropical fanpetals, balai-zortie

Formerly placed here
Species now in other genera include:

References

External links

 
Malvaceae genera